Maryedith Ann Burrell (née Smith; born May 20, 1952) is an American actress, comedian, film and television producer, writer and documentarian best known for starring roles on the television series Fridays, Throb, Ron Howard's Parenthood, and The Jackie Thomas Show as well as recurring roles in the television series Seinfeld and Home Improvement.

Early life
Maryedith Burrell was born Maryedith Ann Smith and raised in Gilroy, California. After attending Santa Catalina School on scholarship, she headed to UC Santa Cruz, working and studying simultaneously with American Conservatory Theater and The San Francisco Mime Troupe. While attending college, Burrell workshopped with The Royal Shakespeare Company and director Peter Brook, as well as Teatro Campensino with Louis Valdez. After two terms at UCSC, she transferred to UCLA and as a student in its Theatre Arts Program received the Hugh O'Brian acting award. The acting award judges included Academy Award winner Jack Lemmon, who became an early mentor.

Roles on television shows such as Days of Our Lives, M*A*S*H and Remington Steele soon followed.

Early acting and writing
After attending college, Burrell worked as a publicist for the new Westwood Playhouse, now known as Geffen Playhouse, where she met actors Jason Robards, Shelley Winters, and Lee Grant who encouraged her to pursue an acting career. She soon began performing with the Los Angeles-based improv troupe The Groundlings. She went on to work with The Second City, The Comedy Store Players, Sills And Company, Off The Wall, and The War Babies. At The War Babies, Ann Marcus, producer of Norman Lear's Mary Hartman, Mary Hartman, invited Burrell to write for The Life and Times of Eddie Roberts. This kicked off a number of writing jobs.

Fridays
In 1979, the producers of Fridays saw Burrell in an HBO presentation of The War Babies at The Roxy Theatre and tapped her for the new American Broadcasting Company late-night comedy show. She became a member of the ensemble, which included Larry David, Michael Richards, and Melanie Chartoff. Her characterizations of the deadly serious Friday Focus Reporter and Battle Boy's chain-smoking mother were standouts.

Post Fridays
Shelley Duvall, a former guest host on Fridays, hired Burrell to write five episodes for her new series, Faerie Tale Theatre. The award-winning show was unique at the time for its cross-pollination of star talent from stage, television, and film. Burrell worked with directors Francis Ford Coppola, Michael Lindsay-Hogg, Peter Medak, and Tim Burton as well as actors Susan Sarandon, Lee Remick, Carrie Fisher, Klaus Kinski, and Burgess Meredith.

A former colleague from the Groundlings, working for NBC, was impressed with Burrell's Faerie Tale Theatre work and tapped her to write a special Christmas film for the network: an adaptation of The Little Match Girl, starring William Daniels. This launched a career writing films and mini-series for every major television network in America as well as several in Europe. Credits include: Mr. St. Nick, The Great Mom Swap, UFO Cafe, Mabel and the Bootleg King, The Last Vampire, Janus Highway, and Dominion for TNT.

Burrell pursued dual careers as a performer and screenwriter. After Fridays, Burrell went on to star in the television series Throb, Ron Howard's Parenthood, The Jackie Thomas Show, and appeared in recurring roles on Seinfeld and Home Improvement. She guest-starred on television shows including Murder, She Wrote, Chicago Hope and The Tonight Show. Burrell acted in several television films, including White Hot: The Mysterious Death of Thelma Todd with Loni Anderson and Those She Left Behind with Gary Cole. She also acted in feature films including Samantha with Martha Plimpton, Ready To Rumble with Oliver Platt, and Kiss Me Goodbye with Sally Field and Jeff Bridges.

As a documentarian, she has produced for National Geographic, Discovery Channel, and TLC, among other networks. In 2018, Burrell worked as creative consultant on an independent film, Raise Hell: The Life and Times of Molly Ivins, about author and activist Molly Ivins.

An overall deal with Disney led Burrell to work as a script doctor for both feature films and television, which she continues to do. Her feature work includes Dominion for Paramount, The Dating Project for Universal, and Emily Post for Sony.

Filmography (actress)

Filmography (writer)

Publishing and teaching
Burrell moved to Asheville, North Carolina, earned a Master of Liberal Arts degree at the University of North Carolina Asheville, and lectures in schools, seminars, and film festivals around the country. She is an adjunct professor at Western Carolina University.

As an author and journalist, Burrell has contributed to Rolling Stone, The Los Angeles Times, The San Francisco Chronicle, The Great Smokies Review, and other publications. Her essay, An Affair to Forget, is included in the anthology What Was I Thinking? 58 Bad Boyfriend Stories(St. Martin’s Press).

References

External links

1952 births
American television actresses
Screenwriters from California
Actresses from California
Living people
People from Gilroy, California
American sketch comedians
Comedians from California